Huron Street may refer to:

Huron Street Historic District, Berlin, Wisconsin, US
Huron Street, highway at Canadian end of Sault Ste. Marie International Bridge
Huron Street, Toronto; location of St. Thomas's, Huron Street and on List of University of Toronto buildings
Huron Street, major artery among List of roads in London, Ontario
Huron Street, major artery of Ann Arbor and Ypsilanti, Michigan
Huron Street, formerly north boundary of London, with Middlesex
Huron Street, Chicago, divided into East Huron Street and West Huron Street
Huron Street (album), by Don Ross, 2001